Gregory John Donnelly is an Australian politician, a member of the New South Wales Legislative Council since 2005, representing the Labor Party.

Background and early career
Donnelly was educated at Mandurah Primary, Christian Brothers College in Fremantle, and University of Western Australia studying industrial relations and economics. He became an official of Shop, Distributive and Allied Employees' Association in 1986, and was promoted to branch secretary. Donnelly is Catholic and has been outspoken about matters associated with his faith.

Political career
Donnelly was appointed to a casual vacancy caused by the resignation of Treasurer Michael Egan and currently serves on several parliamentary committees.

Donnelly has written opinion pieces criticising the representation of women in advertising, a proposal for same sex couples to adopt in NSW and has spoken in NSW Parliament about his opposition to pornography, and has opposed a marriage equality bill put by the NSW Greens.

In November 2016, Donnelly wrote an opinion piece opposing the Safe Schools program.

In May 2017, Donnelly was one of three Labor MPs to vote with the Liberal Party and National Party to block a bill to decriminalise abortion in the state.

References

External links
Donnelly, The Hon Greg speeches in Hansard on the NSW parliament website.

Living people
Year of birth missing (living people)
Australian Roman Catholics
Members of the New South Wales Legislative Council
Australian Labor Party members of the Parliament of New South Wales
21st-century Australian politicians